Ganei Hadar (lit. Hadar Gardens) is a community settlement in central Israel. Located in the Shephelah near Rehovot, it falls under the jurisdiction of Gezer Regional Council.

History
The village was founded in 1930 by immigrants from the United States, who founded the "Gan Hadar - Co-operation" union. The land had been bought by union members from the Arab village of al-Na'ani during the late 1920s, and was the first Jewish settlement in the Gezer region.

References

External links

Official website 

American-Jewish culture in Israel
Community settlements
Populated places established in 1930
Populated places in Central District (Israel)
1930 establishments in Mandatory Palestine